Ladderax is a modular shelving and storage system created by Robert Heal in 1964 for Staples of Cricklewood, London. It is an example of Mid-Century modern design.

Heal was influenced by the work of the "Danish school". This mid-century Scandinavian design movement was largely about reinterpreting simple, linear shapes from Georgian and Shaker pieces, and making them “straighter”.

The Ladderax System consists of a number of upright ladders, supporting shelves and cabinets. These are fixed by resting on steel support rods, hooked on to the rungs of the ladders. They fit into grooves under the shelves and cabinets. This allows easily assembly and flexibility. Ladderax does not require any permanent fixing to a wall, because it self-supports.

References

External links 
 

Furniture
1964 introductions
Do it yourself
Individual models of furniture